Peter Grant Blackburn  (born 25 March 1968) is an Australian badminton player who affiliated with the Ballarat Badminton Association. He competed at the 1996 and 2000 Summer Olympics, and collected four bronze medals at the Commonwealth Games. Blackburn graduated from the Ballarat University College with a Diploma in Teaching in 1991. He was awarded the Hollioake Medallion in 1991, 1994 and 1995 for his outstanding contribution to sport in the City of Ballarat, and in 1999 he was named Ballarat Sportsperson of the Year.

Achievements

Commonwealth Games
Men's doubles

Mixed doubles

Oceania Championships
Men's doubles

Mixed doubles

IBF International
Men's doubles

Mixed doubles

References

External links
 
 
 
 

1968 births
Living people
Sportspeople from Ballarat
Australian male badminton players
Olympic badminton players of Australia
Badminton players at the 2000 Summer Olympics
Badminton players at the 1996 Summer Olympics
Badminton players at the 2002 Commonwealth Games
Badminton players at the 1998 Commonwealth Games
Badminton players at the 1994 Commonwealth Games
Badminton players at the 1990 Commonwealth Games
Commonwealth Games medallists in badminton
Commonwealth Games bronze medallists for Australia
Medallists at the 1994 Commonwealth Games
Medallists at the 1998 Commonwealth Games